Mark Robert Eagleson (August 10, 1861 – April 8, 1917) was a Canadian politician. He served in the Legislative Assembly of British Columbia from 1907 to 1909 from the electoral district of Lilloet, a member of the Liberal party. He died of complications from diabetes in 1917.

References

1861 births
1917 deaths